Dirt was an American lifestyle magazine targeting young men. The magazine was launched in 1991 by Andy Jenkins, Spike Jonze, and Mark Lewman. Lewman, who served as editor-in-chief, said of the debut issue: We're all about sports, music, movies, girls and junk food. We combine these topics with current events, celebrity quotes and true-life stories like our current profile of a Los Angeles gang member recently released from prison. We're mostly about a boy's basic concerns-with hard-edged pieces mixed in. ... Most of the stereotypes about guys are just wrong. I don't know any Bills and Teds.

Dirt later became part of Lang Communications and was headquartered in Seattle, Washington. The magazine folded in 1994.

See also
 List of defunct American magazines

References

1991 establishments in Washington (state)
1994 disestablishments in Washington (state)
Defunct magazines published in the United States
Lifestyle magazines published in the United States
Magazines established in 1991
Magazines disestablished in 1994
Magazines published in Seattle
Men's magazines published in the United States